General Mildmay Fane (3 February 1795 – 12 March 1868) was a British Army officer.

Military career
Born the son of Henry Fane and Anne Fane (née Batson) as well as the grandson of Thomas Fane, 8th Earl of Westmorland, Fane fought at the  Battle of Vitoria, the Battle of San Sebastian and the Battle of the Nive during the Peninsular War as well as the Battle of Quatre Bras during the Hundred Days. He raised the 98th (Prince of Wales's) Regiment of Foot in Chichester in response to the threat posed by the French intervention in Spain in March 1824.

He was promoted to full general on 27 March 1863.

References

Sources
 

1795 births
1868 deaths
British Army generals
Mildmay